Aubrey Webster (September 25, 1910 – November 1, 1999) was a Canadian professional ice hockey right winger who played five games over two seasons in the National Hockey League. In 1930–31 he played one game for the Philadelphia Quakers, and then in 1934–35 played four games for the Montreal Maroons. The rest of Webster's career, which lasted from 1930 to 1946, was spent in various minor leagues.

He was the last surviving former player of the Philadelphia Quakers.

Career statistics

Regular season and playoffs

External links

 LostHockey.com entry

1910 births
1999 deaths
Canadian ice hockey right wingers
Ice hockey people from Ontario
Montreal Maroons players
Philadelphia Quakers (NHL) players
Portland Buckaroos players
Portland Eagles players
Spokane Clippers players
Sportspeople from Kenora
Windsor Bulldogs (1929–1936) players